Robert Cramer may refer to:

 Robert E. Cramer (born 1947), United States Representative from Alabama's 5th Congressional District
Robert Cramer (Swiss politician) (born 1954)